The 98th Mixed Brigade was a unit of the People's Army of the Republic created during the Spanish Civil War. Throughout the war it came to operate on the Madrid, Guadalajara and Levante fronts.

History 
The unit was created on June 1, 1937 in Villena, based on the 279th Battalion of the 70th Mixed Brigade. Mariano Elipe Rabadán was to be appointed commander of the new brigade, although he did not take over the unit and Álvaro Gil Moral was appointed in his place, with Mariano Albert Reigada as commissar. The 98th Mixed Brigade was assigned to the  14th Division.

In July 1937, it intervened in the Battle of Brunete, taking part in the counterattack launched by the 14th Division in the last days of the battle, which managed to reach the outskirts of the city. At the end of the operations, the 98th MB was transferred to the Guadalajara front, where it changed location several times and did not take part in relevant military operations. During the following months there were several changes in the leadership of the brigade.

On March 31, 1938, the unit launched a small offensive in the area of Esplegares, where they occupied some enemy positions and the town of Mocasilla, at the cost of some casualties. On April 28 it was sent together with the 14th Division to the Levante front to reinforce the republican units that were there. It arrived at Castellón de la Plana, later moving to Oropesa. On May 7, the brigade launched an attack against the positions of "La Muela" and "El Morrón", managing to occupy the latter - after suffering numerous casualties - although it lost it shortly after. It was subsequently transferred to La Iglesuela del Cid, but had to leave this locality on May 8, slowly retreating to the south. On May 16, the 98th MB was withdrawn from the front to undergo a reorganization. Shortly after it was transferred again to the Guadalajara front.

During the following months it was attached to the 14th and 12th divisions. Later, the unit left the 12th Division and was added to the 17th Division, moving to the Torija sector. In March 1939, the 98th Mixed Brigade supported the Casado coup, which brought the war to an end.

Command 
Commanders
 Álvaro Gil Moral;
 Ángel Resa Bueno;
 Mariano Román Urquiri;
 Bernabé López Calle;
 Mariano Román Urquiri;
 Florentino Fernández Campillo;
 Antonio Pedraza Palomo;

Commissars
 Mariano Albert Reigada, of the CNT;

Chiefs of Staff
 Pelayo Cerdá;
 Ángel Pérez Martínez;
 Joaquín Osuna Carretero;
 Luis Gravioto Balbós;

Notes

References

Bibliography 
 
 
 
 
 
 

Military units and formations established in 1938
Military units and formations disestablished in 1939
Mixed Brigades (Spain)